Bicycle monarchy (or bicycling monarchy) is a British term for the more informal and modest personal styles of the royal families of countries in Scandinavia and the Low Countries, particularly the Netherlands.

The term 'bicycle monarchy' is often used in a pejorative sense by newspapers in the United Kingdom, reflecting a pride in the pomp and ceremony of the British monarchy.  However, it is not used exclusively as a negative term, and is sometimes used in a favourable light, particularly by those that oppose the more ceremonial side of the Royal Family but do not seek to abolish the monarchy.

Origin
There are two conflicting claims of the origin of the epithet: one deriving from the Dutch monarchy and the other from the Danish monarchy.

The version involving the Netherlands has its roots in Queen Juliana's love of riding bicycles, even during her reign. Although Juliana would still perform official ceremonies, she was more famous in the United Kingdom for her frequent, unscheduled appearances with members of the public. Her daughter, Queen Beatrix, has also been sighted on her bicycle (although less often than her mother), perpetuating "bicycle monarchy" image in the foreign imagination.

The possible reference to the Danish monarchy stems from the Nazi occupation of Denmark during World War II. The non-hostile relationship between the governments of Denmark and Germany prompted accusations of collaboration. In a show of solidarity with the Danish people in the face of such claims, the future King Frederick IX and his wife Ingrid began taking bicycle rides around Copenhagen.

Whoever gave rise to the term, it was not a result of either poverty or lack of constitutional authority. For example, the Dutch monarch, to whom the term is most frequently applied, retains full royal prerogative powers and has a personal wealth of $250 million.

References

Monarchy
Cycling in the Netherlands
Cycling in Denmark